Kent School is a private, co-educational, college preparatory boarding school in Kent, Connecticut. Frederick Herbert Sill established the school in 1906. It is affiliated with the Episcopal Church of the United States. It has a long history as an 'elite school, not a school for elites,' and innovated the sliding-scale tuition model in the early 20th century.

Academics 
Kent School follows a trimester system, where a school year is divided into three terms—fall, winter, and spring. Classes are held from Monday to Saturday. Wednesdays and Saturdays are half days where classes run from 8:30-11:45am. The remaining days hold classes from 8:30am-2:50pm. Classes are held in a two week rotating block system. This is done to allow classes that would not have met on Wednesdays and Saturdays an opportunity to meet the following week during the full academic days.

The school refers to students by form instead of grades—as is customary in the United States. 9th grade is 3rd form and 12th grade is 6th form. 3rd and 4th formers are referred to as underformers and 5th and 6th are referred to as upperformers. Students who stay a fifth year are referred to as PGs (i.e. Post Graduate). PGs are often transfer students from other schools for a variety of reasons. 

Many courses are year-long, while others last only one or two terms. Courses are denoted as major or minor. Minor courses count for only half as much credit as major course. Most students take four courses each trimester; the course load limit is five. Four year students are required to take courses in English, Mathematics, Modern or Ancient Languages, Laboratory Sciences, Visual or Performing Arts, and Theology.

Kent School does not rank students. The school using a six-point system to calculate grades. There is no formal method of converting a six-point grade into a traditional four-point GPA. Students may also receive an E or a U next to their grade to their teacher's discretion. The former refers to 'excellent' and the latter 'unsatisfactory'. Students also receive written feedback from each teacher and coach denoted Comments on their semesterly grades.

Facilities

Academic facilities 

 Foley Hall houses the History and English departments and many classrooms where the humanities are taught.
 Dickinson Science Building is home to the Science Department. It houses many classrooms, and laboratory spaces for biology, chemistry, physics, and environmental science. Dickinson also houses Dickinson Auditorium, a lecture-style room, a greenhouse for use by classes and clubs. The building is also home to the college counseling office.
 Schoolhouse is home to the Mathematics, Modern Language, and Classics departments which are each separated by floor. The basement features multiple offices and classrooms for Modern Language instruction as well as a Language Lab. The top floors house offices and classrooms for mathematics. The middle floors contain offices and instructional rooms for the classics and ancient languages. A floor for administrative offices is also located in the building.
 John Gray Park '28 Library is housed in the first and second floors of Schoolhouse. The library is open every day of the week till 10pm. The library houses an extensive collection of print material, rare books and manuscripts, and access to online databases, journals, etc. The library houses a silent study section at the back and top floors with single person desks. The second floor also houses group study rooms which are available through advanced booking and the Academic Resource Center (ARC) which offers dedicated assistance with research, writing, proofreading, etc.
 Field Building is a girls dorm but also houses the visual arts department in its basement. The arts department features two multi-use studio spaces, a ceramics studio, and a black and white darkroom and processing facility.
 Hoerle Hall is a coed dorm, but also houses an extension of the visual and performing arts department. Its ground floor is home to multi-purpose rooms which can be used as dance studios. A painting studio and digital imaging studio with industrial printers are also housed on the ground floor. 
 Mattison Auditorium houses the schools primary auditorium for student musical and theatrical performances. Its basement also houses the Theatre department, home to classrooms, changing rooms, and set design spaces.
 The Music Center is housed on the third floor of the dining hall. The center is home to the Music department and office spaces. There are sound-proofed practice rooms with upright pianos in each, as well as a large concert practice space. 
 The Administration Building is adjacent to the boardwalk and, in addition to administrative offices, hosts 'new student seminar' classrooms. It also houses offices of the Theology department and the Head of School's office.
 The Howard and Judith B. Wentz Center for Engineering and Applied Sciences is an off-campus building located in the town of Kent, across the Housatonic River. It is home to the Engineering department. It houses offices, classrooms, and lab spaces. Engineering student groups also host meetings in the building. Dance studios are also housed in the building.

Student facilities 

 St. Joseph's Chapel is a Romanesque church located in the center of campus. All school meetings and Formal Dinner, Tuesday, and Sunday chapel services are held here. The Chapel is home to a bell tower with ten bells made by Whitechapel bellfoundry, installed in 1931, and a Hook & Hastings organ. Students can join the Bell Ringing Guild as an activity and learn to play the organ through the Music department.
 Nadal Hockey Rink and The Springs Center is home to a hockey rink and facilities for varsity, JV, and thirds hockey teams.
 Field Building is a dorm which is physically connected to Mattison Auditorium and the Dining Hall.
 Case Dorm, Health Center is a dorm which also houses the Dickinson Health Center in the basement, open 24/7.
 Middle Dorm South (MDS) is a dorm which is physically connected to Borsdorff Hall.
 Borsdorff Hall is a dorm physically connected to MDS and houses a dance studio in its basement.
 North Dorm is a dorm dating to the 1930s and the school's largest.
 The Bourke Racquet Center houses multiple outdoor and indoor hard tennis courts and eight squash courts with facilities for varsity, JV, and 3rds teams. Persons not affiliated with the school may also pay a membership fee to use the facilities.
 The Michael O. Page Equestrian Center is located north of the main campus, on school grounds in the Litchfield Hills.
 Magowan Fieldhouse is home to two basketball courts, a short-course (25yd) pool, gym, indoor golf facilities, and sports medicine facilities. The building also houses locker rooms for basketball, lacrosse, cross country, and volleyball teams and an equipment facility. The building overlooks the Cy Theobald Turf Football Field and G. Foster Sanford ’23 Baseball Field
 Benjamin Waring Partridge '62 Rowing Center is home to a trophy room and an erg room.
 Sill Boat House houses the school's racing shells and other rowing equipment.
 South Fields and South Fieldhouse lies south of campus and is home to multiple fields for soccer and field hockey practice and games. Mountain biking trails, a ropes course, locker rooms, and a bike maintenance shop are also located there.
 Philips Field lies west of campus and is home to two soccer fields. Further west of the fields lies the school's cross-country course. The fields are adjacent to the Head of School's house, and are commonly referred to by students as 'Club Fields.'

Administrative facilites 

 Rev. Richardson W. Schell '69 House houses the Admissions and Alumni & Development offices.
 RAD House is a small building home to the offices of class Deans, named for a Kent student in the early 1920s whose initials were 'RAD.'

Athletics
Kent offers 22 interscholastic sports with 50 interscholastic teams from the thirds, Junior Varsity, and Varsity levels. More than three-quarters of the student body participates in interscholastic sport. Kent is a member of the Founders League, a competitive athletic league composed of NEPSAC schools. Its mascot is the Lion, although it once was the Fighting Episcopalian. Despite Hotchkiss School's location in the same county, Kent's rival is The Loomis Chaffee School and the two schools have a day dedicated to competing against each other, historically called Loomis Day.

Interscholastic sports offered

Fall
Football
Boys Soccer
Girls Soccer
Boys Cross Country
Girls Cross Country
Field Hockey
Volleyball

Winter
Boys Basketball
Girls Basketball
Boys Ice Hockey
Girls Ice Hockey
Boys Squash
Girls Squash
Boys Swimming
Girls Swimming
Co-ed Varsity Diving

Spring
Baseball
Softball
Boys Tennis
Girls Tennis
Co-ed Varsity Golf
Boys Crew
Girls Crew
Boys Lacrosse
Girls Lacrosse

Crew

The Kent School Boat Club was begun at Kent in 1922 with the encouragement of Father Sill. Sill was the coxswain of the Columbia crew which won the first ever Poughkeepsie Regatta.

Kent competed for the Thames Challenge Cup in 1933 with the support of President Franklin D. Roosevelt who sent a letter to Sill offering his "good wishes for a successful trip" and commenting on how "the presence of a crew of American school boys will be helpful in strengthening the ties between good sportsmen of the two countries." That year, Kent won the Thames Challenge Cup. The Times in Britain wrote, "Kent School were almost certainly the best crew that ever rowed in the Thames Cup." Kent competed at Henley 32 times and won 5 times, most recently in 1972. The school was featured twice in Life magazine, once in May, 1937 and again in June, 1948. Stuart Auchincloss '48 was featured on the cover of the latter publication. Kent Boys Crew also won the New England Championship Regatta 25 times since 1947.

The girls team began in 1973. They won Henley in 2002 and two National Championships in 1986 and 1987. They have also won the New England Championship Regatta seven different times, including four of the first five times, it competed for it.

In 2006, Kent Boys Crew won the New England championship and became the first American crew to challenge for the recently established Prince Albert Challenge Cup at Henley. In 2010, Kent Boys Crew won the New England points trophy and placed 1st at Youth Nationals. The team traveled to Henley and were the runners-up for the Princess Elizabeth Cup, losing to Eton College.

Honors
 Henley Royal Regatta, Thames Challenge Cup 1933, 1938, 1947, 1950
 Henley Royal Regatta, Princess Elizabeth Challenge Cup 1972

Football
Football at Kent competes in the Housatonic Valley League. In the past 17 years, the team has earned seven league championships and two New England Championships.

Squash 
In 2021–22, the Kent Boy's squash team won its first boys national title after a 4–3 final against three-time defending champions Brunswick.

Controversies

The TV animated series Family Guy, about a dysfunctional Rhode Island family, premiered in January 1999 and was created by Seth MacFarlane, a 1991 graduate of Kent School. The school's headmaster, Richardson W. Schell, wrote to a number of companies urging them against advertising with the TV show, which he described as "obnoxious". MacFarlane's parents, who worked at the school, resigned in protest.
 	
In 2017, The New York Times reported on a lawsuit alleging that Kent School failed to report alleged sexual misconduct by a faculty member toward a 15-year-old student in 1987 and 1988. The report came on the heels of The Boston Globe's "Spotlight" team revealing decades of alleged sexual abuse at numerous New England prep schools and alleged retaliation for student complaints. The reporters noted faculty alleged as abusers being relocated to different schools, including Kent.

See also
 List of Kent School people – notable Kent School alumni and faculty
 William G. Pollard: Fiftieth anniversary of Kent School

References

External links

 

Boarding schools in Connecticut
Preparatory schools in Connecticut
Co-educational boarding schools
Educational institutions established in 1906
Private high schools in Connecticut
Kent, Connecticut
Schools in Litchfield County, Connecticut
1906 establishments in Connecticut
Episcopal schools in the United States